Gray's grasshopper warbler (Helopsaltes fasciolatus), also known as Gray's warbler, is a species of grass warbler in the family Locustellidae; it was formerly included in the "Old World warbler" assemblage.

The Sakhalin grasshopper warbler was formerly considered conspecific.

Distribution and habitat
This small passerine bird breeds in southern Siberia, northeastern China and Korea. It is migratory, wintering in southeast Asia.  It is a species found in lowland and coastal regions, nesting in forests or thickets.

Description
This is the largest of all the Locustella warblers, approaching the size of the great reed warbler. The adult has an unstreaked olive-brown back, uniformly grey breast and buff underparts, with unmottled dull orange undertail coverts.

The song is a short phrase, loud and distinctive; nothing like the insect-like reeling of European Locustella species, and more musical than that of Pallas's grasshopper warbler.

References

Gray's grasshopper warbler
Birds of North Asia
Birds of Manchuria
Gray's grasshopper warbler
Gray's grasshopper warbler
Taxobox binomials not recognized by IUCN